The Riyadh Marathon is an annual road-based marathon hosted by Riyadh, Saudi Arabia, since 2022.  The organizers state that is the "first official full marathon to be held in the Kingdom".  The marathon has been a World Athletics Elite Label Road Race since its inaugural race.  During the race weekend, a half marathon, a 10K race, and a 4K race are also offered.

History 

A half marathon had been held in Saudi Arabia in 2018.

More than 10,000 people took part in the event.

Course 

All the races start and finish at King Saud University.  The marathon is run on a loop course, although the start and finish lines are a few hundred metres (yards) apart.  The loop is roughly a half marathon in length, and marathoners run the loop twice.

References

External links 
 Official website

2022 establishments in Saudi Arabia
February sporting events
March sporting events
Marathons in Saudi Arabia
International athletics competitions hosted by Saudi Arabia
Recurring sporting events established in 2022